24 Oras Northern Mindanao, formerly Testigo Northern Mindanao is a Philippine television news broadcasting program broadcast by GMA Northern Mindanao. Originally anchored by Kenneth Ragpala,  it premiered on February 5, 2013 replacing Isyu Karon. Joe Legaspina served as the final anchor.

Overview
The program delivered news and current events coming from Northern Mindanao, Caraga and parts of Zamboanga Peninsula (including Isabela City, Jolo and Bongao). It was simulcasted on TV-12 Bukidnon, TV-11 Iligan, TV-5 Ozamis, TV-4 Dipolog and TV-3 Pagadian.

Testigo Northern Mindanao was premiered on February 5, 2013 after the launching of GMA Northern Mindanao, with Kenneth Ragpala as its first anchor. Ragpala was later joined by reporter Joe Legaspina as his co-anchor. Before the year 2013 ends, Ragpala left the newscast leaving Legaspina as the newscast's sole anchor.

This was also the first time that a regional newscast with the same name in Davao City had spun off into another regional newscast for Cagayan de Oro and Northern Mindanao viewers.

Following changes of its now-main newscast 24 Oras, Testigo Northern Mindanao was rebranded as 24 Oras Northern Mindanao effective November 10, 2014.

However, that change suddenly cuts short when the newscast was abruptly cancelled on April 24, 2015 after more than two years of broadcast due to the strategic streamlining happened to all provincial stations of the network. Following the cancellation was the retrenchment of its staff and personalities and the closure of the network's regional news department.

Area of Coverage
Cagayan de Oro and Misamis Oriental
Ozamis City and Misamis Occidental
Iligan City and Lanao del Norte
Marawi City and Lanao del Sur
Malaybalay City and Bukidnon
Dipolog and Zamboanga del Norte
Pagadian City and Zamboanga del Sur
Mambajao and Camiguin
Butuan
Surigao City
Bayugan
Cabadbaran
Agusan del Norte
Agusan del Sur
Surigao del Norte
Dinagat Islands
Ipil and Zamboanga Sibugay

Final Anchor
Joe Legaspina

Final Reporters
Jeik Compo 
Joane Tabique-Abesamis - relief anchor for Joe Legaspina
Kaye Mercado (now with 102.5 Brigada News FM Cagayan de Oro)
Francis Damit

Former Main Anchor and Reporters
Kenneth Ragpala 
Christian Gonzales
Emily Rafols
Pia Abas
Jacky Cabatuan
Brecil Kempis
Aude Hampong

References

GMA Network news shows
GMA Integrated News and Public Affairs shows
Philippine television news shows
2013 Philippine television series debuts
2015 Philippine television series endings
Mass media in Cagayan de Oro